Exodus of Iranian Jews refers to the emigration of Persian Jews from Iran in the 1950s and the later migration wave from the country during and after the Iranian Revolution of 1979, during which the community of 80,000 dropped to less than 20,000. The migration of Persian Jews after the Iranian Revolution is mostly attributed to fear of religious persecution, economic hardships and insecurity after the deposition of the Imperial regime, consequent domestic violence and the Iran–Iraq War. 

Whilst the Iranian constitution generally respects the rights of non-Muslim minorities (though there are some forms of discrimination), the strong anti-Zionist policy of the Islamic Republic of Iran created a tense and uncomfortable situation for Iranian Jews, who became vulnerable to the accusation of alleged collaboration with Israel.

Many of the formerly 80,000-strong Iranian Jewish community had left Iran by 1978. Subsequently, more than 80% of the remaining Iranian Jews fled or migrated from the country between 1979 and 2006. A small Jewish community of almost 10,000 still resides in Iran as a protected minority.

Background

After the destruction of the first Temple in 586 B.C.E, thousands of Jews were forced into exile and began to immigrate to different parts of the world. Some Jews found their new home in Iran and began a flourishing Jewish community there. The Iranian Jewish community solidified the Jewish presence in the Middle East. In the year 642 C.E, Islamic rule was established in Iran and religious minorities, including Jews, became second class citizens. Some Iranian Jews  began to migrate to other parts of the world to escape the growing Jewish resentment in Iran. In the 16th and 17th century, Shiite Islam became the religion of Iran and tensions between the Shiite Muslims and Iranian religious minorities escalated. Iranian Jews became the subject of forced conversions to Islam and many social restrictions. During the years between 1892 and 1910, some pogroms against Jews took place in Shiraz and other towns, culminating in the 1910 Shiraz blood libel, which resulted in thirteen deaths, injury, robbery, vandalism and near-starvation for the 6,000 Jews of Shiraz.

Historian Ervand Abrahamian estimated that 50,000 Jews were living in Iran around 1900, with majority of them residing in Yazd, Shiraz, Tehran, Isfahan and Hamadan.

Migration in early 1950s
The founding of Israel in 1948 coincided with increased Jewish emigration from several middle-eastern Nations including Iran. Anti-Jewish sentiment increased under prime minister Mohammed Mosaddegh, and continued until a coup in 1953, in part because of the weakening of the central government and strengthening of the clergy in the political struggles between the shah and the prime minister. 

There are conflicting estimates on the number of Jews who chose to leave Iran during those years. According to Trita Parsi, by 1951 only 8,000 of 100,000 Iranian Jews chose to emigrate to Israel. However, according to Sanasarian, during 1948–1953, about one-third of Iranian Jews, most of them poor, emigrated to Israel.

Stability in the 1950s, to instability in the late 1970s
After the deposition of Mossadegh in 1953, the reign of Shah Mohammad Reza Pahlavi was the most prosperous era for the Jews of Iran. Due to political instability in the 1970s and prompted by the Islamic Revolution, most Iranian Jews fled the country.

According to the first national census taken in 1956, Jewish population in Iran stood at 65,232, but there is no reliable data about migrations in the first half of the 20th century. David Littman puts the total figure of emigrants to Israel in 1948–1978 at 70,000.

Main exodus late 1970s to 1990s
The tensions between the loyalists of the Shah and Islamists throughout the 1970s initiated the mass-migration of Iranian Jews, first affecting the higher-class. Instability caused thousands of Persian Jews to leave Iran prior to the revolution - some seeking better economic opportunities or stability, while others feared the potential Islamist takeover.

In 1979, Supreme Leader Ayatollah Khomeini met with the Jewish community upon his return from exile in Paris and issued a fatwa decreeing that the Jews were to be protected. Nevertheless, emigration continued. At the time of the 1979 Islamic Revolution, 60,000 Jews were still living in Iran. From then on, Jewish emigration from Iran dramatically increased, as about 30,000 Jews left within several months of the revolution alone. Since the Revolution, much of Iran's Jewish population, some 30,000 Jews, have emigrated to the United States, Israel, and Europe (mainly to the United Kingdom, France, Germany, Italy, and Switzerland).

When Shah Reza Pahlavi was overthrown and the new Islamic Regime under Ruhollah Khomeini was brought into power, the Jewish population in Iran began to look for routes out of the country. Although, Ayatollah Khomeini had proclaimed that the rights of Jews were to be protected, the new government would not issue Iranian Jews passports and barred them from leaving the country. The Jewish population began to fear for their lives because many Jewish leaders were killed in the revolution because of their support for Zionism and their disapproval of Jews being considered as second class citizens. Thousands of Iranian Jews began to look for ways in which they could smuggle themselves and their families out of the country. Most Iranian Jews had to leave their homes and possessions in order to leave Iran illegally as selling all of their possessions would alert to the authorities that they were trying to leave the country. Leaving the country was very dangerous as many of the roads out were being watched by the government and, if caught, one could face imprisonment or death.

Some sources put the Iranian Jewish population in the mid- and late 1980s as between 50,000 and 60,000. An estimate based on the 1986 census put the figure for the same time period, at approximately 55,000. For the 1990s there has been more uniformity in the figures, with most sources since then estimating roughly 25,000 Jews remaining in Iran.
Many Iranian Jews chose to immigrate to the United States and have built large communities in Los Angeles, Miami, Texas, and New York. According to the 2010 Foreign Born Population Survey, an estimated 100,000 Iranian Jews are currently living in Los Angeles alone. At first, Iranian Jews did not receive a warm welcome from the other Jewish groups living in the United States. Most of these Jews are Ashkenazi, while Iranian Jews are Mizrahi, and they do not share the same culture or some of the same tradition. These new Iranian Jewish communities in the United States have thrived and have become great centers of Jewish learning and study for all Jews. The Iranian Jewish communities in the United States have kept many of their traditions alive through the teaching of Sephardic Jewish customs in schools and synagogues across the United States. Iranian Jews living in the United States have also helped to bring other Jews from Iran and other parts of the world into the United States so they can escape religious persecution and harassment as well. 

The migration of Persian Jews after the Iranian Revolution has generally been attributed to fear of religious persecution, economic hardships and insecurity after the deposition of the Shah regime and consequent domestic violence and the Iran–Iraq War.

Aftermath
Jews have their minority rights protected in Iran, though there is official discrimination. In order to prevent circumvention of emigration restrictions, the Iranian government prevents Jewish families from traveling abroad contemporaneously.

The United States State Department estimated the number of Jews in Iran at 20,000–25,000 as of 2009. The 2012 census did put the figure of remaining Jewish community in Iran at about 9,000. The Jewish population of Iran was 8,756 according to 2013 Iranian census. According to Iranian census, the remaining Jewish population of Iran was 9,826 in 2016; while a 2021 population worldpopulationewview website numbered the Jews in Iran at 8,500.

The Persian Jewish community has further attempted to help by sponsoring or raising funds to help their Jewish brothers and sisters emigrate to the United States. Jewish leaders in the early twentieth century were focused on bringing working and healthy Jews out of Europe and into the United States. Then their philosophy changed, in response to the dire political circumstances in Europe, as they started to help Jews of all ages and health conditions to come to America and assist them to settle down and assimilate into American life whilst keeping their core principles and faith.

References

External links
From Babylonia To Beverly Hills: The Exodus of Iran's Jews Documentary.

History of the Jews in the Middle East
Jewish exodus from Arab and Muslim countries
Jewish Persian and Iranian history
Islam and Judaism
Immigration to Israel
20th-century Judaism